Alfredton is a farming community in the southern North Island of New Zealand. It is located to the southeast of Eketahuna.

Alfredton has a school, church, a 9-hole golf course, community domain and a community hall.

The town is named after Prince Alfred, Duke of Saxe-Coburg and Gotha who was the second son and fourth child of Queen Victoria.

Education

References

Populated places in Manawatū-Whanganui
Tararua District